Maschito is a town and comune of the province of Potenza, in the Basilicata region of southern Italy. Like other towns in the Vulture area, Maschito was repopulated by Albanian refugees after the occupation of Albania by the Ottoman Empire.

Geography
It is bounded by the comuni (Municipalities), of Forenza, Ginestra, Palazzo San Gervasio, Venosa.

Maschito has a typical Mediterranean climate with slight mountain characteristics, because of its distance from the sea.

History
Maschito was founded in 1467 by King Ferdinand I of Naples, when the Albanian hero Skanderbeg was sent with numerous troops to fight the Angevin pretenders to the throne of Naples and the Barons.
The capture of Kruja by the Turks and the abandonment of Shkodër (1478–79) led to the first migration of Albanians (Arbëreshë) to Basilicata.

In 1533, when the Fortress of Koroni fell the Albanian refugees of the area were allowed to settle areas of the Kingdom of Naples, including Maschito. At that time the territory of Maschito belonged to the Bishop of Venosa and the Prior of Gerosolmitano of Bari.

By law, around November 17, 1539, the Notary Giacomo Citamiore of Venosa, and the Spanish viceroy of Naples, Pedro Álvarez de Toledo, ceded the aforementioned territory to Giovanni de Icis. The Albanians were obligated to pay one ducat  a year from the annual income of each household, and 200 ducats extra a year if the number of homes increased by one.

Economy
The economy is based on agriculture, especially grapes and olives.

Notes and references

Arbëresh settlements
Cities and towns in Basilicata